The Asian Football Confederations AFC U-19 Women's Championship 2007 was the 4th instance of the AFC U-19 Women's Championship. It was held from October 5 to 16, 2007 at Chongqing in China.

Qualification

Qualified teams 
 : Defending champions
 : 2006 runners-up
 : 2006 3rd place
 : 2006 4th place
 : 2006 5th place
 : Group A winner
 : Group B winner
 : Group A runner-up

Venues 
 Chongqing Olympic Sports Centre
 Datianwan Stadium

Seeding

Group stage
All times are China Standard Time

Group A

Group B

Knockout stages
All times are China Standard Time

Semi-finals

3rd-place match

Final

Countries to participate in 2008 FIFA U-20 Women's World Cup

Goalscorers

External links
 Official Site
 rsssf.com; Tournament results

 
women
2007 in Chinese football
2007
AFc
U19
2007 in North Korean football
2007 in South Korean football
2007 in Australian soccer
2007 in Burmese football
2007 in Thai football
2007 in Taiwanese football
2007
2007 in youth association football